Paramaenas affinis is a moth of the family Erebidae. It was described by Rothschild in 1933. It is found in Namibia and South Africa.

References

Spilosomina
Moths described in 1933